Andrew George Frommelt (October 18, 1921 – April 26, 2017) was an American politician in the state of Iowa.

Frommelt was born in Dubuque County, Iowa. He was a labor and insurance representative as well as a real estate broker. He served in the Iowa House of Representatives  for district 69 from 1953 to 1959, and in the Iowa State Senate from district 35 from 1959 to 1971. He was married and had a son and a daughter.

References

1921 births
2017 deaths
People from Dubuque County, Iowa
Businesspeople from Iowa
Democratic Party Iowa state senators
Democratic Party members of the Iowa House of Representatives
20th-century American businesspeople